The Sienne is a  long river in northwestern France located in the departments of Calvados and Manche, Normandy. It flows into the English Channel near Regnéville-sur-Mer. Its longest tributaries are the Soulles and the Airou. The largest towns on the Sienne are Villedieu-les-Poêles and Quettreville-sur-Sienne.

References

Rivers of France
Rivers of Manche
Rivers of Calvados (department)
Rivers of Normandy
1Sienne